Dichopogon strictus (syn. Arthropodium strictum), commonly known as chocolate lily, is a herbaceous perennial plant species native to Australia.

Description
The species has up to 12 leaves that are linear or lanceolate in shape and are up to 65 cm long and 1–12 mm wide. The racemose inflorescence is up to 1 metre high. This appears between August and January in the species' native range. The individual, drooping flowers range in colour from pale mauve to dark purple. The common name chocolate lily alludes to the scent of the flowers which resembles chocolate, caramel or vanilla.

The tubers, which are juicy and slightly bitter in taste, were eaten by Indigenous Australians.

Taxonomy
The species was formally described in 1810 by Scottish botanist Robert Brown, based on plant material collected at Port Dalrymple in Tasmania. Brown gave it the name Arthropodium strictum. In 1876, English botanist John Gilbert Baker transferred it to the genus Dichopogon. The name is treated as Dichopogon strictus in the World Checklist of Selected Plant Families and by the National Herbarium of New South Wales, while the name Arthropodium strictum is used in the Northern Territory, Queensland, South Australia, Victoria and Tasmania as well as in the 2006 Australian Plant Census.

Cultivation
Plants prefer a well-drained situation with partial to full sun exposure. In drought conditions, plants may shrivel back to the tuber then resprout with autumn rains, whereas in situations where steady moisture levels are maintained in the soil, the summer flowering period will be extended. The species is suited to group plantings under trees or may be grown in containers.

See also

 List of plants known as lily

References

Flora of New South Wales
Flora of the Northern Territory
Flora of Queensland
Flora of South Australia
Flora of Tasmania
Flora of Victoria (Australia)
Asparagales of Australia
Root vegetables
Lomandroideae
Taxa named by John Gilbert Baker
Taxa named by Robert Brown (botanist, born 1773)